The Sudirman Range, also known as the Snow Mountains, Dugunduguoo, or Nassau Range is a mountain range in Central Papua province, Indonesia. It is named after the first armed forces commander-in-chief and Indonesian national hero Sudirman. It comprises a western portion of the Maoke Mountains. The highest peak in Oceania and Australasia, Puncak Jaya (4,884 m), is located here, as well as the large Grasberg copper and gold mine, operated by the Freeport company based out of the United States. Other peaks of the Sudirman Range are:

 Sumantri (4,870 m)
 Ngga Pulu (4,863 m)
 Carstensz East (4,820 m or 4,808 m)

See also
 Lorentz National Park

References

Mountain ranges of Western New Guinea
Landforms of Western New Guinea
Landforms of Central Papua